The Banana Sector Retraining Project was a program run by the HEART Trust/NTA during 2008 and 2009. It aimed to retrain displaced workers and farmers in the banana/plantain industry and those whose jobs may disappear because of loss of preferential treatment in the European market. It was implemented in the six traditional banana-growing parishes: St. James, St. Catherine, St. Thomas, St. Mary, Portland and Clarendon. 
 
The project was a small-scale pilot. It did not provide jobs directly for people and was not used to influence changes to the banana/plantain sector, but its findings and outcomes were intended to help inform and develop a larger scale programme of assistance to workers in Jamaica's banana/plantain communities. What they learnt and the experiences of participants in the project were intended also to help inform the design of training and certification programmes to be implemented by HEART Trust/NTA (and/or other institutions) in the future.

History 
The 15-month project began in October 2008 and ended in December 2009, at a cost of 354,700 euros, funded by the EU and HEART Trust/NTA. It consisted of continuous training needs analysis, career counseling workshops, pre-vocational, vocational skills and computer-based training. It taught participants modern skills for transition to new areas of employment or skills to improve banana productivity. The ultimate goal of the program was to ease participant’s uncertainty about their future and give them sustainable skill sets.

A follow up phase two, designed from the results of the project, was planned for post December 2009 and was intended for a larger target group.

Project goals 
 To understand the scale of the negative changes to Jamaica's banana and plantain communities
 To find out which communities and individuals are impacted
 To find out what skills and education the affected people have
 To find out how training and development can help them earn a living

Project beneficiaries 
People dependent on the banana/plantain producing industry:
 Small Banana/Plantain Farmers
 Banana/Plantain Workers
 Port Banana/Plantain Workers
 Immediate families of the above
 Members in the above communities

Project activities 
Career Counselling Workshops
Workshops featured career counselling, motivational speeches and try-a-skill exercises where participants got a taste of skills such as housekeeping, construction and agricultural applications.

Pre-vocational training programmes
Focus on the employability skills of the participants in areas such as: communicating effectively in the workplace and working in a team.

Vocational and Skills Training
These were provided through existing programmes at HEART institutions or with partner institutions. Participants were required to pass a grade nine level test that concentrated on general knowledge, practical mathematics and English Language.

Computer Based Training
ICT enabled remedial training programmes comprising WordCraft – reading and writing, and MathCraft – grades 1–9 were conducted over a six-month period. Not all project participants received this type of training.

Project partners 
Ministry of Agriculture
Ministry of Education
Rural Agricultural Development Authority
All Island Banana Growers Association
Jamaica Agricultural Society
Social Development Commission
Jamaica Producers
Fair Trading Commission

Gallery
Launch of The European Union Banana Support Programme in Jamaica

See also
 Banana Support Programme

References

External links
Deljam Press
HEART Trust NTA Planning and Project Development Division
Jamaica Information Service
Jamaica Information Service
Go-Jamaica.com

Organisations based in Jamaica
Banana production